Trinidad "Trini" Mendenhall is a Texas businesswoman and the recipient of the 2004 Texas Women's Hall of Fame award. Together with her husband she co-founded Fiesta Mart, Inc. in 1972, a 45-store retail grocery chain across Texas. She is the president of Fulton Shopping Center, a real estate investment company in Houston and is the vice president of First Quality Fruit & Produce Company.

Board memberships 
Mendenhall is on the board of Catholic charities. In 2004 she was appointed by Governor Rick Perry to the Advisory Board of the Economic Development Stakeholders. She has served on many other boards including those for: Ronald McDonald House, Baylor College of Medicine, University of St. Thomas, Houston Ballet Public Affairs Committee, Alexis de Tocqueville Society, End Hunger Network and more.

Philanthropy 
in 1997, she created the Trini and O.C. Mendenhall Foundation, which works to empower women, minorities and children. In 2002, she created the Mendenhall Asthma Research Laboratory at Baylor's Biology of Inflammation Center in memory of her late husband. She is a trustee at the Baylor College of Medicine and serves on the board of trustees of the Houston Ballet.

Recognition 
Mendenhall received the Gaia Award by the Susan G. Komen Breast Cancer Foundation and the Woman of Distinction Award by the ABC Channel 13/Crohn's and Colitis Foundation of America. She is a recipient of the Willie Velasquez Hispanic Excellence Award and was named one of Houston's 2000 Millennium Makers by the Evin Thayer Foundation. The Alliance for Mulitcultural Community Services recognized her as a Star Among Us in 2001. In 2010 she received the Alice Graham Baker Crusader Award. In 2018 she was honored with the Catholic charities Legacy Award.

References 

Women in Texas
20th-century American businesspeople
Year of birth missing (living people)
Living people
Place of birth missing (living people)
21st-century American businesspeople
American women company founders
American company founders
Retail company founders
20th-century American businesswomen
21st-century American businesswomen